Kenko, Qenqo or Q'inq'u (possibly Aymara for "twisted, bent") or also Inka Anatawi is an archaeological site in Peru. The site was declared a National Cultural Heritage (Patrimonio Cultural) of Peru by the National Institute of Culture.

See also 
Molloko

References

Archaeological sites in Puno Region
Archaeological sites in Peru